Robert Spottiswood (20 January 1884 – 1966) was an English football player and manager.

Career
Born in Carlisle, Spottiswood played as a half back for Carlisle United, Croydon Common, Crystal Palace, Clapton Orient, Aberdare Athletic, Treherbert, Sittingbourne and Elsecar Main.

He later became a football manager, and was in charge of Inter Milan between 1922 and 1924.

Personal life
His brother Joe was also a player.

Bob Spottiswood died in early 1966, in Bromley, Greater London, aged 81 or 82.

References

1884 births
1966 deaths
Footballers from Carlisle, Cumbria
English footballers
English football managers
Carlisle United F.C. players
Croydon Common F.C. players
Crystal Palace F.C. players
Leyton Orient F.C. players
Aberdare Athletic F.C. players
Sittingbourne F.C. players
Southern Football League players
English Football League players
Inter Milan managers
English expatriate football managers
Expatriate football managers in Italy
English expatriate sportspeople in Italy
Association football defenders